The California Sea Kings are a professional basketball team in San Jose, California, and members of The Basketball League (TBL).

History
The California Sea Kings were founded in 2008, and joined the ABA for the 2009 season. After 11 seasons the team decided to become a professional basketball team.  

On November 23, 2020, The Basketball League (TBL) announced the Sea-Kings would join the league for the 2021 season.

References

The Basketball League teams
Sports teams in San Jose, California
Basketball teams established in 2008
2020 establishments in California
Defunct American Basketball Association (2000–present) teams